A conspiracy is a secret act to obtain some goal, usually understood with negative connotations.

Conspiracy may also refer to:

Music
 Conspiracy (band), a progressive rock band founded by Billy Sherwood and Chris Squire
 Conspiracy (Junior M.A.F.I.A. album)
 Conspiracy (King Diamond album)
 Conspiracy (Michael Bormann album)
 Conspiracy, an album by The Raven Age
 "Conspiracy", a song by Paramore from All We Know Is Falling

Film and television
 Conspiracy (1930 film), a film by Christy Cabanne
 Conspiracy (1939 film), a film by Lew Landers
 Conspiracy (2001 film), a dramatization of the Nazi 1942 Wannsee Conference concerning the "Final Solution"
 Conspiracy (2008 film), an action-drama starring Val Kilmer
 The Conspiracy (2012 film), a Canadian conspiracy thriller by Christopher MacBride
 The Conspiracy (1916 film), a silent film
 Conspiracy?, a 2004 TV series on the History Channel
 Conspiracies (TV series), a 2003 series on BBC and TechTV
 "Conspiracy" (Star Trek: The Next Generation), an episode of Star Trek: The Next Generation
 24: Conspiracy, a spin-off series from the TV series 24, for viewing on mobile phones only
 "Conspiracy", the third episode of the 1965 Doctor Who serial The Romans
 "Conspiracy" (Superstore), an episode of the  television series Superstore
 Conspiracy Series with Shane Dawson, an American documentary web series created by YouTuber Shane Dawson

Games 
 Conspiracy (board game)
 Conspiracies (video game)
 KGB (video game) or Conspiracy
 Magic: The Gathering Conspiracy, a 2014 series of the Magic the Gathering collectible card game

Books and comics
 Conspiracies (novel)
 Conspiracy (comics), a team of super powered beings in the Marvel Comics universe
 Conspiracy, a 1998 fantasy novel by J. Robert King, set in the Forgotten Realms

Other uses
Conspiracy (criminal), a criminal offense
Conspiracy (demogroup)
Conspiracy '87, the 45th World Science Fiction Convention, held in Brighton, England, in 1987
Conspiracy Entertainment, a video game publisher
Conspiracy, the collective noun for group of ravens

See also
 Conspiracy theory (disambiguation)
 Conspirator (disambiguation)
 Cowspiracy